Astacosia oblonga is a moth of the subfamily Arctiinae. It was described by Hervé de Toulgoët in 1955. It is found on Madagascar.

References

Moths described in 1955
Lithosiini
Moths of Madagascar
Moths of Africa